Countess Palatine Christina Magdalena of Kleeburg (27 May 1616– 14 August 1662) of the House of Wittelsbach, Margravine of Baden-Durlach. She was the daughter of John Casimir, Count Palatine of Kleeburg and Princess Catherine of Sweden (a granddaughter of Gustav I of Sweden, making Christina a link between the house of Vasa and the later houses of Holstein-Gottorp and Bernadotte). Christina Magdalena was a sister of Charles X of Sweden, and grew up in Sweden.

Biography 
Christina Magdalena was born in Nyköping, Sweden, as her parents did not move to Germany until 1618, three years after their wedding. In 1622, the family moved back to Sweden to avoid the Thirty Years War. Christina Magdalena was described as a "somewhat pretty and pleasing woman" and was reportedly a friend of the queen, Maria Eleonora of Brandenburg. She accompanied Maria Eleonora to the King in Germany in 1631, and returned to Sweden with her in 1633. The last mentioned year, there was unsuccessful negotiations about a marriage to Bernard of Saxe-Weimar.

After the death of her mother in 1638, Christina Magdalena was asked by the Swedish parliament to contribute to the education of Maria Eleonora's daughter, the later Queen Christina. She did this until her marriage in 1642.

Negotiations for her marriage began in 1637, and included "a young and rich Marquess of Huntly" in 1641. The same year, Frederick VI, Margrave of Baden-Durlach visited Sweden. After having befriended her brother, he was accepted as her suitor.

The wedding, held in Stockholm, was postponed until 30 November 1642 after a fire broke out at the ball before their designated wedding date on 26 November. Her spouse applied for a position in the Swedish army, but the Swedish military did not wish to employ foreign princes, and therefore, the couple moved to Germany.

In 1654, her brother succeeded as king of Sweden, and in 1656, he granted her to estate Kutzenhausen, which provided her with an income. Christina Magdalena became Margravine consort of Baden-Durlach when her spouse became Margrave in 1659. She was widowed in 1662.

In Germany, Christina Magdalena was given a good judgement by her contemporaries and described as an "excellent" character.

Issue
All Swedish kings from Adolf Frederick to Charles XIII descend from Christina Magdalena. The eight children of Frederick and Christina, including two ancestors of Swedish royal lines, were:
 Friedrich Kasimir (1643–1644)
 Christine (1645–1705)
∞ 1. 1665 Albert II, Margrave of Brandenburg-Ansbach (1620–1667)
∞ 2. 1681 Frederick I, Duke of Saxe-Gotha-Altenburg (1646–1691)
 Eleonore Katharine (*/† 1646)
 Friedrich VII. Magnus (1647–1709), Margrave of Baden-Durlach
∞ 1670 Princess Auguste Marie of Schleswig-Holstein-Gottorp (1649–1728) (→ Ancestors of Swedish kings of the House of Holstein-Gottorp, via their daughter Albertina Frederika of Baden-Durlach, who was the mother of King Adolf Fredrick of Sweden; ancestors of the House of Bernadotte, via Gustaf VI Adolf's mother, Victoria of Baden, who was a granddaughter of Adolf Frederick's great-granddaughter Sophia of Sweden
 Charles Gustav of Baden-Durlach (1648–1703)
∞ 1677 Princess Anna Sophie of Braunschweig-Wolfenbüttel (1659–1742)
 Katharine Barbara (1650–1733)
 Johanna Elizabeth of Baden-Durlach (born: 6 November 1651; died: 28 September 1680), married on 26 January 1673 the Margrave John Frederick of Brandenburg-Ansbach (born: 4 October 1654; died: 22 March 1686) (→ Ancestors of the Swedish kings of the House of Bernadotte, by Charles XV of Sweden's and Oscar II's mother, Josephine of Leuchtenberg, as was their daughter's daughter was her granddaughter)

 Friederike Eleonore (*/† 1658)

Ancestry

References and notes

|-

1616 births
1662 deaths
Margravines of Germany